105 Squadron may refer to:
 No. 105 Squadron RAF, a squadron in the Royal Air Force
 105 Squadron (Israel), a squadron in the Israeli Air Force